Hichem Mohamed El Hamdaoui (born 18 November 1995) is a professional French football striker who plays for Villefranche SJB.

Career
Born in Nice, El Hamdaoui is a product of his native OGC Nice youth sportive system, but he played only 11 games for it reserves team in the Championnat National 2. In 2017 he was transferred to Belgium team Tertre Hautrage.

In August 2017 he signed a two-year contract with the Ukrainian Premier League club Zirka Kropyvnytskyi. He made his debut in the Ukrainian Premier League for FC Zirka on 20 August 2017, playing in a match against FC Zorya Luhansk.

In March 2019, he signed a one year contract with Torpedo Minsk.

References

External links 

1995 births
Living people
Footballers from Nice
French footballers
Association football forwards
Ukrainian Premier League players
Liga II players
Championnat National 2 players
Belarusian Premier League players
Serie D players
OGC Nice players
FC Zirka Kropyvnytskyi players
ASC Daco-Getica București players
FC Torpedo Minsk players
A.C. Bra players
French expatriate footballers
Expatriate footballers in Belgium
Expatriate footballers in Ukraine
Expatriate footballers in Romania
Expatriate footballers in Belarus
Expatriate footballers in Italy
French expatriate sportspeople in Belgium
French expatriate sportspeople in Ukraine
French expatriate sportspeople in Romania
French expatriate sportspeople in Italy